"You Got Me Going Again" is a song recorded by the Australian synthpop band Machinations. It was released in August 1985 as the third single from the band's second studio album, Big Music. The song peaked at number 39 on the Australian Kent Music Report.

Track listing
 7" Single (K 9784)
 Side A "You Got Me Going Again" - 3:37
 Side B "I Ain't Waiting for No Train"

 12" Single (X 13219)
 Side A "You Got Me Going Again"  (Extended)  
 Side B1 "You Got Me Going Again" (Sing-A-Long With Naomi)  
 Side B2 "You Got Me Going Again"  (Sing-A-Long Without)

Charts

References 

1985 songs
Machinations (band) songs
1985 singles